Neptune is a planet in the Solar System.

Neptune may also refer to:
 Neptune (mythology), a god in Ancient Roman mythology

Companies
 Neptune Computer Inc., a Canadian consumer electronics company
 Neptune Distribution, a UK comic distribution company
 Neptune Technology Group, a US water-metering equipment manufacturer owned by Roper Technologies
 Neptune Aviation, an aerial firefighting company

Computing
 Neptune chipset, a code name for the Intel Pentium 430NX chip set
 Amazon Neptune, a graph database product
 Sega Neptune, a planned Sega console that was never produced
 Sun Neptune, a Sun network interface card
 Windows Neptune, an unreleased version of Microsoft Windows

Film and television
 Neptune, California, a fictional location in Veronica Mars
 Neptune, a fictional submarine in For Your Eyes Only
 USS Neptune, a fictional submarine in Gray Lady Down
 Neptune, a character in the SpongeBob SquarePants series
 Neptune Vasilias, a character in RWBY, an amine-influenced web series

Literature
 Neptune (Marvel Comics), a Marvel Comics character
 Sailor Neptune or Michiru Kaioh, a character in the Sailor Moon franchise
 Neptune, a comic book in the Worlds of Aldebaran comic book series

Music

Bands
 Neptune (Italian band), a band from Verona, Italy
 Neptune (American band), a band from Boston
 The Neptunes, a group of hip-hop producers
 Neptune Records, a record label

Albums
 Neptune (The Duke Spirit album)
 Neptune (Northern Pikes album)
 Neptune (Toshinobu Kubota album)

Songs
 "Neptune" (song), a 2003 song by InMe
 "Neptune", a song by Sufjan Stevens, Bryce Dessner, Nico Muhly and James McAlister from Planetarium

Classical
 "Neptune, the Mystic", a movement in Gustav Holst's The Planets suite
 Neptune - Poem of the Sea, an orchestral work by Cyril Scott

Places

United States
 Neptune Beach, Florida, a beachfront city
 Neptune Township, New Jersey
 Neptune City, New Jersey, a borough
 Neptune, Ohio, an unincorporated township 
 Neptune, West Virginia 
 Neptune, Wisconsin

Elsewhere
 Neptune Range, a mountain range in Antarctica
 Neptune Islands, an island group in South Australia

Theatres
 Neptune Theatre (Halifax), a theatre in Nova Scotia
 Neptune Theatre (Liverpool), a theatre in the United Kingdom
 Neptune Theatre (Seattle), a performing arts venue in Seattle, Washington

Vehicles

Aircraft 
 Beriev Be-2500 or Neptune, a super-heavy amphibian cargo aircraft
 DRS RQ-15 Neptune, an unmanned reconnaissance aerial vehicle
 Lockheed P-2 Neptune, a naval patrol bomber and anti-submarine warfare aircraft

Ships 
 Neptune (1780 ship), a convict ship in Second Fleet, to New South Wales
 Neptune (galleon), a 1986 ship replica built for Roman Polanski's film Pirates
 CS Neptune, a 1862 Confederate Army tugboat
 French ship Neptune (1778), a 74-gun ship of the line
 French ship Neptune (1803), a Tonnant-class ship of the line
 French ship Neptune (1807), a brig launched in Venice
 French ship Neptune (1839), an 80-gun ship of the line
 French battleship Neptune, a Marceau-class ironclad built in 1892
 HMS Neptune (1683), a 90-gun second rate
 HMS Neptune (1757), a 90-gun second rate
 HMS Neptune (1797), a 98-gun second rate
 HMS Neptune (1832), a 120-gun first rate
 HMS Neptune (1878), an ironclad battleship acquired by the Royal Navy in 1878
 HMS Neptune (1909), an early dreadnought launched
 HMS Neptune (20), a Leander-class light cruiser
 Neptune-class cruiser, a proposed class of cruisers planned for the British Royal Navy
 HMNB Clyde or HMS Neptune, an operating base in the United Kingdom for the Royal Navy
 USS Neptune (ARC-2), a Neptune-class cable repair ship acquired by the US Navy in 1953
 USS Clyde (1863), a 294-ton side-wheel steam gunboat briefly named Neptune
 USS Neptune (1863), a 1244-ton screw steamship
 USS Neptune (1869) or USS Manhattan, a monitor
 USS Neptune (AC-8), a collier in World War I

Video games
Hyperdimension Neptunia or Neptune, a role-playing video game series
 Hyperdimension Neptunia (video game) or Neptune
 Neptune, a character in Hyperdimension Neptunia
 Neptune, a shark-like enemy in Resident Evil
 AFO Neptune, a task force in Medal of Honor
Neptune Escape Rocket, a key component in Subnautica

Other uses
 NEPTUNE, an underwater observatory
 Neptune (owarai), a Japanese comedy group
 Eggs Neptune, a layered breakfast/brunch food
 Neptune Cable, a submarine HVDC cable in the New York area
 Neptune Cork, an Irish basketball team
 Neptune Terrace, a public housing estate in Chai Wan, Hong Kong
 WEKhilpurnil or Neptune, a hybrid Tea rose
 Neptune (cruise missile), a Ukrainian cruise anti-ship missile

People with the surname
 Yvon Neptune (born 1946), prime minister of Haiti 2002–2004

See also 

 French ship Neptune, a list of ships of the French Navy
 HMS Neptune, a list of ships of the British Royal Navy
 King Neptune (disambiguation)
 Neptun (disambiguation)
 Neptune City (album), a 2007 album by Nicole Atkins
 Neptunium, a chemical element
 Operation Neptune (disambiguation)
 Spanish ship Neptuno, a list of ships of the Spanish Navy
 USS Neptune, a list of ships of the United States Navy
 
 
 :Category:Neptune